Matthew Thomas (born July 21, 1995) is an American football linebacker for the Edmonton Elks of the Canadian Football League (CFL). He played college football at Florida State. He signed with the Pittsburgh Steelers as an undrafted free agent in 2018.

Early years
Matthew grew up the 4th oldest out of 8 kids in the Overtown Section of Miami-Dade County. Growing up very poor Thomas found his niche in football and quickly became a legend on the gridiron within the city of Miami, earning himself the nickname "Big 6".Thomas vowed to break the cycle of poverty in his family.  Thomas attended Booker T. Washington High School in Miami, Florida. He was rated consensus five-star recruit coming out of high school and was ranked among the top prospects in his class. He committed to Florida State University to play college football on National Signing Day in 2013.

College career
As a freshman at Florida State in 2013, Thomas played in four games before undergoing season-ending shoulder surgery. He received a medical redshirt and did not play in that season's National Championship Game. Due to failing a drug test at the National Championship Game, Thomas was suspended for the first six games of the 2014 season. After serving his suspension, he returned to game action against Notre Dame on October 18, 2014. He went on to tally 26 tackles and 2.5 tackles-for-loss on the season. He also played in that season's Rose Bowl, registering three solo tackles and one assisted tackle.

In 2015, Thomas was suspended for the entire season due to being academically ineligible. Thomas would bounce back in 2016 as the second leading tackler on the team. In that season's Orange Bowl, he made nine solo tackles and assisted on six tackles. In 2017, Thomas played in 11 of the team's 12 regular season games, and then decided not to play in the Independence Bowl. He later accepted an invitation to play in the 2018 East–West Shrine Game.

Professional career

Pittsburgh Steelers
Thomas signed with the Pittsburgh Steelers as an undrafted free agent on April 28, 2018. He made the Steelers 53-man roster as an undrafted rookie, playing in 10 games before being waived on December 1, 2018 and re-signed to the practice squad.

Baltimore Ravens
On January 2, 2019, Thomas signed a reserve/future contract with the Baltimore Ravens. He was waived on August 1, 2019.

St. Louis BattleHawks
Thomas signed with the St. Louis BattleHawks of the XFL on January 8, 2020. He was waived during final roster cuts on January 22, 2020.

Saskatchewan Roughriders
Thomas signed with the Saskatchewan Roughriders of the CFL on April 14, 2020. After the CFL canceled the 2020 season due to the COVID-19 pandemic, Thomas chose to opt-out of his contract with the Roughriders on September 1, 2020. He opted back in to his contract on December 29, 2020.

References

External links
Florida State Seminoles bio
College statistics at Sports Reference

1995 births
Living people
Booker T. Washington Senior High School (Miami, Florida) alumni
Players of American football from Miami
American football linebackers
Florida State Seminoles football players
Pittsburgh Steelers players
Baltimore Ravens players
St. Louis BattleHawks players
Saskatchewan Roughriders players
Players of Canadian football from Miami